The Fort du Replaton is a fortification of the Séré de Rivières system in Modane, France. It is connected to Modane by an aerial tram, which continues on from Replaton to the Fort du Sapey on a much higher eminence.

The Fort du Replaton was built between 1884 and 1892 using an arrangement that anticipated the later Maginot Line fortifications, and resembles Fort Saint Michel near Toul. It cost approximately 2 million francs. Unlike a Maginot fortification, Replaton was enclosed by a perimeter wall and had surface barracks. The original armament consisted of two 95mm and two 155mm guns along a communicating gallery on the rock behind. The fort received concrete reinforcement in the early 1900s.

A renovation project in 1930 added 75mm guns in place of the 95mm weapons. The fort was fired upon in 1940 and 1944. It is the property of the Association de la Traversée es Alpes. It is not open to the public, but is in a good state of preservation.

Redoute du Replaton
It was armed with a single 95mm gun.

See also
 Alpine Line

References

Bibliography 
Mary, Jean-Yves; Hohnadel, Alain; Sicard, Jacques. Hommes et Ouvrages de la Ligne Maginot, Tome 5. Paris, Histoire & Collections, 2009.

External links 
 Replaton (fort du) at fortiff.be 
 Replaton (redoute du) at fortiff.be 
 Fort du Replaton at fortiffsere.fr 

Séré de Rivières system